Earth Break is a science fiction podcast produced by Skylark Media and starring Jenny Slate.

Background 
The show is a science fiction podcast produced by Skylark Media. Jenny Slate stars as Lynn Gellert, who is the only survivor of an alien invasion. Gellert is also pregnant. The podcast debuted at the 2019 Tribeca Festival.

Reception 
Jade Matias Bell wrote in The A.V. Club that Slate adds "charm and flow to a sometimes cliché script." Steve Greene praised Slate's acting in IndieWire saying that she pulled off "a magnetic central performance". Nick Douglas made a similar comment in LifeHacker saying that Slate's performance was the "best acting in an audio drama, some of the best acting in anything at all".

References 

Audio podcasts
2019 podcast debuts
2019 podcast endings
Science fiction podcasts
Scripted podcasts
American podcasts